Kusumkumari Das (1875–1948) was a Bengali poet, writer and social activist. She is known as a poet and mother of Jibanananda Das, the eminent poet of modern Bengali literature and also served as the secretary of Barishal Women Society.

Biography
She was educated at Calcutta Bethune School. At the age of 19, she was married to Satyananda Das in 1894 and bore him two sons (Jibanananda Das and Ashokananda Das) and a daughter (Sucharita Das).

She inherited the habit of writing from her father, Chandranath Das. Her father used to write light verses. She published poems in several magazines, among them were Mukul, Brahmabadi and Pravasii. She used to keep journals regularly. But most of them could not found because they were either lost or damaged by herself. Her famous poem is "Adarsha Chele", in English, "the Exemplary Boy" or "the Ideal Boy". The first two lines of this poem gained legendary status:

 আমাদের দেশে হবে সেই ছেলে কবে
 কথায় না বড় হয়ে কাজে বড় হবে?
 মুখে হাসি বুকে বল, তেজে ভরা মন
 “মানুষ হইতে হবে” এই যার পণ !!
Apart from housekeeping and writing, Kusumkumari Das had active participation in social activities. As a female member of Brahmo society, she pioneered women's participation in social activities in Barisal. From 1319-38 of Bengali calendar she acts as an Acharya in  Women's day prayer.  Even she sometimes acts as an Acharya in general assembly of Brahsomaj too.

She was the secretary of Barisal Mohila Sabha (Barishal Women Society).
This society worked to help poor girls, to train midwives, to found girls school, to facilitate indoor education for women etc.

Publications
Kavyamukul
Pouranik Akhyayika
Kusumkumari Daser Kabita
Dainandin Dinlipi

References

1875 births
1948 deaths
19th-century Bengalis
20th-century Bengalis
Bengali poets
20th-century Bengali poets
Bengali female poets
Bengali writers

People from Barisal
Writers from Kolkata

Indian women poets
Indian poets
20th-century Indian poets
Indian writers
20th-century Indian writers
20th-century Indian women writers
Indian social workers
Indian educators
Indian women educators
Educationists from India
Indian educational theorists
20th-century Indian educational theorists

Poets from West Bengal
Women writers from West Bengal
Poets in British India